Óscar Serrano Gámez (born 25 May 1978) is a Spanish tennis coach and former player. , he is the coach of Kaja Juvan.

Serrano retired in 2005, after playing a total of 19 matches during his ATP career. He became professional in 1996, and achieved his career-high ATP ranking on 27 November 2000, reaching No. 128 in the world.

ATP Challenger and ITF Futures finals

Singles: 6 (2–4)

Doubles: 2 (1–1)

Performance timeline

Singles

External links

1978 births
Living people
Spanish male tennis players
Spanish tennis coaches
Tennis players from Catalonia
Tennis players from Barcelona